Skeffington is a village in Leicestershire.  Additionally it is used as follows:

People

Given name
 Skeffington Lutwidge (1737-1814), Royal Navy admiral
 Robert Wilfred Skeffington Lutwidge (1802-1873), barrister, Commissioner in Lunacy and early photographer: uncle of Charles Lutwidge Dodgson, better known as Lewis Carroll

Surname
 Arthur Marten Skeffington, (1890-1976), American optometrist
 Arthur Skeffington, (1909-1971), British politician
 Francis Sheehy-Skeffington,  (1878-1916) Irish suffragist pacifist writer
 Hanna Sheehy-Skeffington,  (1877-1946) suffragette and Irish nationalist
 John Whyte-Melville-Skeffington, 13th Viscount Massereene, (1914-1992), British politician and landowner
 John Skeffington, 14th Viscount Massereene, (born 1940) British peer
 Sir Lumley Skeffington, 2nd Baronet, (1771-1850) British nobleman and playwright
 Owen Sheehy-Skeffington, (1909-1970), Irish university lecturer and Senator
 Sir William Skeffington, (c. 1465-1535), Lord Deputy of Ireland
 Sir William Farrell-Skeffington, 1st Baronet, (1742-1815), British soldier

Title
 Skeffington baronets

Fiction
 Mr. Skeffington,  1944 film starring Bette Davis, from the novel by Elizabeth von Arnim
 Frank Skeffington, the protagonist of the 1956 novel The Last Hurrah by Edwin O'Connor.

Other
 Skeffington's Gyves a variant name of Scavenger's daughter

See also
 Skivington
 Viscount Massereene